Father Nicholas Bock, SJ (13 November 1880, Saint Petersburg, Russian Empire – 27 February 1962, New York City, United States) was a Russian Empire diplomat who later became a Catholic priest.

Biography

Born in Saint Petersburg to diplomat Ivan Bock and Natalia Kossovich, Bock graduated Petrischule German school in 1899 and thereafter entered the law faculty of Saint Petersburg University. In 1903, he joined the Ministry of Foreign Affairs, and in 1912 was appointed secretary of the Russian diplomatic mission to the Vatican. From 1916 to 1917, he acted as chargé d'affaires of the mission. After the October Revolution, he remained in Italy as chairman of the Committee for Assistance to Russian refugees.

In 1924, Bock moved to Paris, engaging in small business there, and in 1925 adopted Catholicism, converting from Russian Orthodoxy. In 1931, he married and moved to Japan, teaching Russian, French and German in Takaoka. In 1943, Bock moved to the city of Kobe. In spring of 1945, his house was destroyed during a raid by U.S. aircraft; in the same year, his wife died, after which he went to the Jesuit Order. In 1948, at the age of 67 years, he was ordained as a priest.

Soon, he moved to the United States, living in California, where there were many Russian Catholics who had fled Harbin after Communists had come to power in China. In San Francisco, Bock created the Byzantine Catholic parish of Our Lady of Fatima. He was later transferred to the Russian center at Fordham University in New York City. In 1950, he took part in the Congress of the Russian Catholic clergy in Rome, where he was deputy chairman of the Archbishop Alexander Evreinov. Bock died on February 27, 1962, in New York.

Family

His brother, Boris Bock, was Pyotr Stolypin's son in law.

Bibliography

Osmidnevnye spiritual exercises. - New York, 1953.
Russia and the Vatican on the eve of the Revolution: Memoirs of a diplomat. - New York, 1962.

References

Converts to Eastern Catholicism from Eastern Orthodoxy
Former Russian Orthodox Christians
Russian Eastern Catholics
Expatriates from the Russian Empire in Germany
Expatriates from the Russian Empire in Italy
Italian emigrants to France
French emigrants to Japan
Japanese emigrants to the United States
1880 births
1962 deaths
American Jesuits
Diplomats of the Russian Empire
20th-century American Roman Catholic priests